Affleck (also spelled Afflect, Aflek, Afflick, etc.) is a Scottish surname that may be of Gaelic origins.

The name is a toponymic surname, derived from several possible places, including Auchinleck, Ayrshire (Scots pronunciation Affleck), Affleck, Lanark and Affleck, Angus. The Gaelic achadh (Anglicized to Auchin) means field.

Notable people with the surname include:
Arthur Affleck (1903–1966), Australian aviator
Ben Affleck (born 1972), American actor, film director and screenwriter
B. F. Affleck (1869–1944), American businessman
Bruce Affleck (born 1954), retired former professional ice hockey defenceman
Casey Affleck (born 1975), American actor, Ben Affleck's brother
David Affleck (1912–1984), Scottish professional footballer
Edmund Affleck (1725–1788), British naval officer
Ewan Affleck, Canadian physician
Francis Affleck (1950–1985), Canadian race car driver
Gavin Affleck (born 1958), Canadian architect
George Affleck (footballer) (1888–?), Scottish footballer for Grimsby Town and Leeds City
George Affleck (entrepreneur) (born 1964), Canadian media businessman
Gilbert Affleck (1684–1764), British politician
Ian Affleck (born 1952), Canadian physicist
James Ormiston Affleck (1840-1922), Scottish physician and medical author
John Affleck (1712–1776), British politician
John Affleck (coach), American college sports coach
Keith Affleck, Australian sports shooter
Mary Hunt Affleck (1847–1932), American poet
Mike Affleck (born 1984), American football player
Neil Affleck, American actor, animator, and director
Paul Affleck, Welsh professional golfer 
Philip Affleck (1726–1799), British admiral, younger brother of Sir Edmund Affleck
Raymond Affleck (1922–1989), Canadian architect
Simon Affleck (1660–1725), Swedish tax official
Thomas Affleck (1745–1795), Pennsylvanian cabinetmaker
Thomas Affleck (planter) (1812–1868), a Scottish-American plantation owner.
William Affleck (1836–1923), Australian politician
  James Whigham Affleck  (1915-1989) Scottish physician and psychiatrist.

 Ali Affleck - Scottish / American musician.

 Affleck baronets, a baronetage of Great Britain

References 

Surnames of Scottish origin
Toponymic surnames